Balrampur (Bihar Assembly constituency) is an assembly constituency in Katihar district in the Indian state of Bihar.

Overview
As per Delimitation of Parliamentary and Assembly constituencies Order, 2008, No 65. Balrampur Assembly constituency is composed of the following: Balrampur and Barsoi community development blocks.

Balrampur, Bihar Assembly constituency is part of No 11 Katihar (Lok Sabha constituency).

Members of Vidhan Sabha

Election results

2010
In the 2010 state assembly elections, Dulal Chandra Goshwami, Independent, won the newly created Balrampur assembly seat defeating his nearest rival Mahbub Alam of CPI(ML)L.

2015
In the 2015 Bihar Assembly Elections, AIMIM has fielded Adil Hasan Azad who is a well-known Lawyer from this assembly constituency. In this election Communist Party of India (Marxist–Leninist) Liberation candidate Mahbub Alam won Balrampur assembly seat defeating his nearest BJP rival Barun Kumar Jha. JD(U) candidate Dulal Chandra Goswami of JDU got third position in this seat.

2020

See also
 Barsoi Assembly constituency

References

External links
 

Assembly constituencies of Bihar
Politics of Katihar district